Jonathan Clark (born 12 November 1958 in Swansea) was a Welsh footballer. His regular position was as a midfielder. He played for in the English Football League for Manchester United, Derby County, Preston North End, Bury, and Carlisle United.

Club career
Clark was in Manchester United's youth set-up and made his first-team debut in a First Division match against Sunderland on 10 November 1976 at the age of 17. It was to be his only first-team appearance for the club. He joined Derby County for £50,000 in September 1978, playing with the club in the First and Second Division until 1981. 

During his time with Preston North End, he was the club's player of the year for the 1984–85 season.

Management career
The following season he served as the club's caretaker manager including a spell where the club won five matches in a row. This was a highlight of a poor season which saw the club only win 11 games and eventually finish 23rd in the Fourth Division and have to seek re-election to the Football League.

International career
He was capped at international schoolboy and played twice for the Wales national under-21 football team.

Post-playing career
After retiring from football he worked in the pub trade for 25 years including running the Clarence Hotel in Blackpool.

References

External links
MUFCInfo.com profile

1958 births
Footballers from Swansea
Welsh footballers
Derby County F.C. players
Manchester United F.C. players
Preston North End F.C. players
Bury F.C. players
Carlisle United F.C. players
Living people
Association football midfielders
Wales under-21 international footballers
Preston North End F.C. managers
Welsh football managers